Thane Gustafson (born 1944) is a professor of political science at Georgetown University, Washington, D.C., United States. He specializes in comparative politics and the political history of Russia and the former USSR.

Life 
Gustafson holds degrees in both political science and chemistry from the University of Illinois, and a doctorate from Harvard University. He is a former professor at Harvard, and a former analyst for RAND Corporation. He is Senior Director of Russian and Caspian Energy for IHS Cambridge Energy Research Associates (IHS CERA).

Gustafson is the author of Capitalism Russian Style, Crisis amid Plenty: The Politics of Soviet Energy under Brezhnev and Gorbachev (which was awarded the Marshall Shulman Book Prize as the best book on Soviet affairs), coauthor (with Daniel Yergin) of Russia 2010 and What It Means for the World, and Wheel of Fortune: The Battle for Oil and Power in Russia. Served as a Peace Corps volunteer in Côte d'Ivoire From 1966 to 1968 with his wife Ruth Gustafson.

Works 
 Capitalism Russian-style Cambridge, England ; New York : Cambridge University Press, 1999. 
 Wheel of fortune : the battle for oil and power in Russia, Cambridge, Massachusetts ; London, England : The Belknap Press of Harvard University Press, 2012. 
 Crisis amid plenty., Princeton University Press, 2016. 
 The Bridge Harvard University Press, 2020. 
 Klimat: Russia in the Age of Climate Change. Harvard University Press, 2021.

References

External links

Living people
Georgetown University faculty
RAND Corporation people
Harvard University alumni
University of Illinois alumni
1944 births